Johnmarshall Reeve (born October 6, 1959) is an American psychologist whose research focuses on educational psychology and human motivation. He is a professor in the Institute of Positive Psychology and Education at Australian Catholic University and a former editor-in-chief of the peer-reviewed journal Motivation and Emotion.

References

External links

Faculty page

Living people
1959 births
Tennessee Technological University alumni
Texas Christian University alumni
Academic staff of Korea University
Academic staff of the Australian Catholic University
Educational psychologists
Academic journal editors
American educational psychologists